Ria Baran (2 November 1922 in Dortmund, Germany – 12 November 1986) was a German pair skater. She skated together with Paul Falk and twice became World champion and in 1952 Olympic champion. She was one of the oldest female figure skating Olympic champions.

Ria Baran married Paul Falk during her active international figure skating. Therefore she is sometime listed as Ria Baran-Falk or Ria Falk.

The pair skated for the club Düsseldorfer EG and had no coach.  Until 1951 Ria Baran and Paul Falk were not able to participate in international competitions because Germany was excluded from the international sport after World War II. They were the first couple which performed side by side double jumps and they also invented the Lasso-Lift.

Baran and Falk were never defeated in amateur competition.

Between 1950 and 1952 Ria Baran was voted 3 times running as the female athlete of the year in Germany.

After winning the Olympics in 1952 they turned pro and worked for Holiday on Ice.

Baran later worked as a secretary.

Results
(pairs with Paul Falk)

References
 

1922 births
1986 deaths
German female pair skaters
Figure skaters at the 1952 Winter Olympics
Olympic figure skaters of Germany
Olympic gold medalists for Germany
Olympic medalists in figure skating
World Figure Skating Championships medalists
European Figure Skating Championships medalists
Medalists at the 1952 Winter Olympics
Sportspeople from Dortmund
20th-century German women